Enhanced Network Selection (sometimes referred to as Enhanced Network Service, or simply ENS) extends GSM by making it possible for a GSM cellular device (e.g., handset) to be "homed" OTA (over the air) to different networks. This made it possible for Cingular Wireless, while it was still operating two networks post merger with AT&T Wireless, to "home" a given cellular device to either the "orange" (old Cingular Wireless) or "blue" (old AT&T Wireless) network. That can improve performance for certain customers because without ENS a GSM device will only select a non-home network when a "usable" home network signal doesn't exist, even when a non-home network has a better signal or when the home network has no available capacity.

For ENS to work, both an ENS-capable device and an ENS SIM are needed.
 Most mobile devices sold by Cingular from the end of 2004 should be ENS-capable.
 ENS SIMs are marked "64K".  (Prior SIMs are no more than 32KB.  There is no other benefit to the increased memory in the SIM.)

Cingular states that any device to be activated in excess of 10000 quantity is required to support ENS.

Mobile phones